Graham Patrick Martin (born November 14, 1991) is an American actor. He is best known for his recurring role as Eldridge on Two and a Half Men (2010–12) and former teen hustler Rusty Beck on the series finale of The Closer and in its spinoff series, Major Crimes (2012–2018). Martin also portrayed Bill Engvall's older son in the sitcom The Bill Engvall Show (2007–09).
He starred in the films Jack Ketchum's The Girl Next Door (2007) and Rising Stars (2010).

Personal life
Martin attended Fiorello H. LaGuardia High School in New York City. When asked, in a TNT Newsroom interview, to describe himself, he responded: "I'm a New Yorker from New Orleans who lives in Los Angeles."  
When asked what inspired him to act, Martin shared that his older sister was the first in his family to become interested in acting. Martin, his two brothers and sister attended a performing arts summer camp called French Woods, where:

Filmography

References

External links

1991 births
Living people
American male child actors
American male television actors
21st-century American male actors
Fiorello H. LaGuardia High School alumni
Male actors from Louisiana
People from Thibodaux, Louisiana